"To Love You" is a song by American bluegrass band Country Store. It was a standalone single and was the group's only charting hit. The song became a minor hit in the United States in late 1969 and early 1970, reaching #85 on Record World in December and #103 on Billboard in January.

Chart history

Tavares cover
"To Love You" was covered by Tavares in 1974.  Their version was included as the B-side of their hit, "She's Gone" (U.S. Billboard #50).

References

External links
 

1969 songs
1969 singles
Tavares (group) songs
Songs written by Dennis Lambert
Songs written by Brian Potter (musician)